Cortland Free Library is a historic library building located at Cortland in Cortland County, New York.  It consists of one colossal story, seven bays wide, that stands on a high basement. It is constructed of brick in the Georgian Revival style and built in 1928.  The entrance is marked by a projecting portico with four columns.

It was listed on the National Register of Historic Places in 2008.

External links
 Official web site

References

Library buildings completed in 1928
Libraries on the National Register of Historic Places in New York (state)
Georgian Revival architecture in New York (state)
Buildings and structures in Cortland County, New York
1928 establishments in New York (state)
National Register of Historic Places in Cortland County, New York